There have been three baronetcies created for persons with the surname Hume, two in the Baronetage of Nova Scotia and one in the Baronetage of Great Britain. One creations is dormant while two are extinct.

The Hume Baronetcy, of Polwarth, was created in the Baronetage of Nova Scotia on 19 December 1637. For more information on this creation, which became dormant in 1794, see Lord Polwarth.

The Home Baronetcy, of North Berwick, was created in the Baronetage of Nova Scotia in circa 1671 for George Hume. On the death of the fourth Baronet in 1747 the title became either extinct or dormant.

The Hume Baronetcy, of Wormleybury in the County of Hertford, was created in the Baronetage of Great Britain on 4 April 1769 for Abraham Hume, Member of Parliament for Steyning and Tregony. He was succeeded by his son, the second Baronet. He was a floriculturist and member of parliament. The title became extinct on his death in 1838.

Hume baronets, of Polwarth (1637)
see Lord Polwarth

Home baronets, of North Berwick (1671)
Sir George Hume, 1st Baronet (c. 1657)
Sir John Hume, 2nd Baronet (died 1695)
Sir Gustavus Hume, 3rd Baronet (c. 1670–1731)
Sir Charles Hume, 4th Baronet (died 1747)

Hume baronets, of Wormleybury (1769)
Sir Abraham Hume, 1st Baronet (–1772)
Sir Abraham Hume, 2nd Baronet (1749–1838)

References

Dormant baronetcies in the Baronetage of Nova Scotia
Extinct baronetcies in the Baronetage of Great Britain